Whitesville is an unincorporated community in Union Township, Montgomery County, in the U.S. state of Indiana.

History 
A post office was established at Whitesville in 1852, and remained in operation until it was discontinued in 1919. Joseph S. White served as an early postmaster.

Geography 

References 

Unincorporated communities in Montgomery County, Indiana
Unincorporated communities in Indiana